Hibbertia acrotrichion is a species of flowering plant in the family Dilleniaceae and is endemic to a restricted area of Western Australia. It is a small, erect shrub with linear, cylindrical leaves and yellow flowers arranged singly in leaf axils with eleven stamens arranged in groups.

Description
The eleven stamens are arranged in three groups of three and two single stamens. The three carpels are glabrous and there is one ovule per carpel. Flowering has been recorded in August and September.

Taxonomy
Hibbertia acrotrichion was first formally described in 2004 by Judith R. Wheeler in the journal Nuytsia from specimens she collected in the Fitzgerald River National Park in 2001. The specific epithet (acrotrichion) is derived from Greek and means "small hairs at the tip", referring to the small tuft of hairs at the tip of otherwise glabrous leaves.

Distribution and habitat
This hibbertia grows in sandy soil in heath or mallee heath between Bremer Bay and Ravensthorpe in the Esperance Plains biogeographic region in the south-west of Western Australia.

Conservation status
Hibbertia acrotrichion is classified as "Priority Two" by the Western Australian Government Department of Parks and Wildlife meaning that it is poorly known and from only one or a few locations.

See also
List of Hibbertia species

References

acrotrichion
Flora of Western Australia
Plants described in 2004